"Corona and Lime" is a song by American rapper Shwayze. It was released in July 2008 as the second single from his debut album, Shwayze.

Chart performance
The single made a "Hot Shot Debut" at #26 on the Billboard Hot 100 on the chart week of August 2, 2008, making it Shwayze's highest debut on the chart. It rose to #23 the next week, based on more digital sales. It also made a Hot Shot Debut on the Pop 100 at #36 the same week, and then on the second week moved up to #32. A music video to this song has been released.

Charts

References

External links

2008 singles
2008 songs
Shwayze songs
Music videos directed by Shane Drake